Kathgodam railway station (station code: KGM) is railway station located in Kathgodam town near Haldwani, just 35 km from Nainital Town in Nainital district of Uttarakhand State of India.

The station code is KGM and is 101 km from the headquarters of the Izzatnagar railway division of North Eastern Railway zone of Indian Railways. There are four platforms. A single broad-gauge railway line serves diesel trains.

Location
The railway station is located in Kathgodam city at the foot of Sivalik Hills at a distance of 35 km from Nainital.
It is located at 625 m above mean sea level. The nearest airport is Pantnagar Airport at the distance of 33 km.

Kathgodam railway station is linked by roads to inner Himalayan region of Kumaon. It is connected to Nainital via Jeolikote, which is connected to Almora, Ranikhet, Baijnath, Gwaldam, Bageshwar and further eastwards to Pithoragarh.

History
By the end of 19th century, Kathgodam formed one end of the 66-mile-long Rohilkund and Kumaon Railway, a private line that connected Kathgodam to Bareilly. The Rohilkund and Kumaon Railway was transferred to the Government of India and merged into the Oudh and Tirhut Railway on 1 January 1943. On 14 April 1952, the Oudh and Tirhut Railway was amalgamated with the Assam Railway and the Kanpur–Achnera section of the Bombay, Baroda and Central India Railway to form North Eastern Railway, one of the 16 zones of the current Indian Railways.

Services 
Trains that ply for Kathgodam are New Delhi–Kathgodam Shatabdi Express, Lucknow Junction–Kathgodam Express,  Kathgodam Express, Ranikhet Express, Uttarakhand Sampark Kranti Express, Bagh Express.

Accident  
On 29 April 1953, at about 21:40 hours, 307  Dn. NainiTal  Express from Kathgodam  derailed between Kichcha and Baheri stations on the Kathgodam–Bareilly single line  section of the North Eastern  Railway. The train engine and the four coaches behind it capsized and the following three coaches derailed and the last four coaches remained on the line.

Gallery

References 

Railway junction stations in India
Railway stations in Nainital district
Izzatnagar railway division
Transport in Haldwani-Kathgodam